Stephania Louise Potalivo (born 26 September 1986 in Charlottenlund, Copenhagen) is a Danish actress and former child star. She is also a sister of Christian Potalivo.

Early life

Stephania debuted in 1995 in Jørn Faurschou film Farligt venskab ("Dangerous friendship"). She is also known for her roles in Lykkefanten (1997), Buldermanden,  in 1996 and Mirakel (2000).

In 1998 she won a "Camério" at the Carrousel International du Film for "Best Actress".

Career

In 2009–2010 she studied at the Danish film actor academy.

In 2012 she joined the TV 2 Zulu sitcom SJIT Happens, for which was nominated for a Robert for "Best Actress" in 2015. In 2015, she also appeared in TV 2's dance program Vild med Dans ("Dancing with the Stars") where she danced with Morten Kjeldgaard. The pair got the highest score from the judges thrice. The pair achieved a place in the final but was beaten by Ena Spottag and Thomas Evers Poulsen.

Filmography

TV series

References

External links
 
 Stephania Potalivo, Internet Movie Database 
 Stephania Potalivo, filmdatabasen 
 Stephania Potalivo, danskefilm.dk 
 Stephania Potalivo i Skuespillerhåndbogen
 Vild med dans

1986 births
Danish child actresses
Living people
Actresses from Copenhagen
People from Gentofte Municipality